2019 Albanian local elections were a set of elections in Albania held on 30 June 2019. Voters were asked to elect mayors, municipal council members, municipal unit mayors and municipal unit members. These were the second local elections in Albania since substantial administrative reforms legislated in 2014 reduced the number of municipalities in the country to 61.

The Central Election Commission of Albania was responsible for administrating the elections. 

Following months of political crisis, the opposition parties refused to participate in the election accusing the government and the Prime Minister of vote buying, voters intimidation and links with criminal organizations that led to a Socialist Party majority in the previous elections.

The President had originally postponed the election date to October 13th after many protests organized by the opposition parties, some of which turned out violent, but it was not accepted by the government and the CEC, which decided to continue with the process on the original date. 

The Socialists ran uncontested in 31 municipalities, facing smaller parties and independent candidates in the other 30 municipalities, including the newly formed Bindja Demokratike, resulting in an absolute win by the Socialists in all municipalities except Finiq, and resulted in the Socialists gaining the most votes in all city council elections except Finiq and Pukë. In most areas, turnout was low, ranging between under 10% in Shkodra to around 38% in Librazhd. Only one municipality, Pustec, was outside of this range, and had a turnout of over 50%.

Parties and coalitions 
Following the decision of the Albanian opposition to not run in the elections. The Socialist party and their alliance had an advantage to win every district without having any competition besides smaller third party opposition. This decision came from Lulzim Basha following the Albanian political crisis. Following rumors of vote buying and intimidation. The two following alliances were the Hope for Change (Shpresa për Ndryshim) a coalition of Centrist to Right-wing and the Alliance for a European Albania (Aleanca për Shqipërinë Europiane) a coalition of Far left to Centrist parties which consisted of the following parties:

Election Results 
Five days after the election, on July 4, 2019, only preliminary results were available. The final results were not published until the end of July. The Albanian opposition had boycotted the elections leading to the Socialists running uncontested in 31 municipalities, However Shkodër and Finiq remain lead by the opposition. As for the rest belonging to the Socialist Party. According to official figures, the turnout was 22.97% or 812,249 people. The opposition stated that, according to their calculations, only 534,528 people took part, which means that the turnout was 15.12%. The elections were declared as a farce by leader of the opposition Lulzim Basha at the time. Shkodër was handed back to Voltana Ademi following a trial against the official winner who had been suspected to have been involved in trafficking.

References

External links
Central Elections Commissions

2019 in Albanian politics
2019
Albania
June 2019 events in Europe